Music From the Original Motion Picture Soundtrack - Mermaids is the soundtrack album from the film Mermaids starring Cher, Winona Ryder, Christina Ricci and Bob Hoskins.

The Mermaids soundtrack was released in Europe on November 13, 1990, and on December 8, 1990, in the U.S. The album also peaked at number sixty-five on the Billboard 200. Two singles, both recorded by Cher, were released to promote the soundtrack: "Baby I'm Yours" (originally recorded by Barbara Lewis), released as the first European single, and the worldwide hit "The Shoop Shoop Song (It's in His Kiss)" (originally recorded by Betty Everett), which was released as the second European single. It was also Cher's first single from her album, Love Hurts. In the U.S., "The Shoop Shoop Song" was the first single from the soundtrack.

"Baby I'm Yours" was not a success, only reaching number eighty-nine in the UK Singles Chart. However, "The Shoop Shoop Song" was a worldwide hit, becoming Cher's second number one hit in the UK. The song also peaked in the top ten of almost every European country, but failed to receive much attention in North America, peaking at number thirty-three in the U.S. and number twenty-one in Canada. Although the success in mainstream airplay was not as strong in North America, the song did receive strong adult contemporary airplay in both the U.S. and Canada, peaking at number seven in the U.S. Adult Contemporary chart and number four in the Canadian Adult Contemporary chart.

Critical reception

Allmusic's Brian Mansfield gave the album three stars out of five, saying it is "full of whimsical pre-Beatles pop". He specifically described "Sleepwalk" as "gorgeous".

Track listing

Charts

Certifications and sales

Production and personnel
 Performer: Cher
 Producer: Peter Asher
 Performer: Shelley Fabares
 Performer: Frankie Valli
 Performer: The Four Seasons
 Performer: Lesley Gore
 Performer: Mickey & Sylvia
 Performer: The Miracles
 Performer: Santo & Johnny
 Performer: Jimmy Soul
 Performer: Doris Troy
 Performer: Smokey Robinson
 Music supervisor: John Kalodner
 Mastering supervisor: David Donnelly
 Mastering: Dan Hersch
 Coordination: Debra Shallman
 Photography: Kerry Hayes
 Design: Kevin Reagan
 Design: Janet Wolsborn

References

External links
 Geffen official site

Albums produced by Peter Asher
1990 soundtrack albums
Geffen Records soundtracks
Comedy film soundtracks
Drama film soundtracks